The 2012 Gujarat Legislative Assembly elections were held in the Indian state of Gujarat in December 2012 for all 182 members of the Gujarat Legislative Assembly. Incumbent Chief Minister Narendra Modi of Bharatiya Janta Party (BJP), in power since 2002, was running for his fourth term. The leader of the opposition was Shaktisinh Gohil of the Indian National Congress (INC).

Elections were held in two phases, the first on 13 December and the second on 17 December 2012. Total voting turnout of both phases was 71.32%, highest since 1980. Results were declared on 20 December 2012.

The BJP, led by Narendra Modi, won 116 seats out of total 182 seats and formed the government while INC won 60 seats. BJP has been in the power in Gujarat since 1995.

Polls
Elections were held in two phases, the first on 13 December and the second on 17 December 2012.

Phase-I
First phase of polling was held on 13 December 2012 witnessed 70.75% of record breaking voting. Within three hours, the voter turnout was 18 per cent and by 1 pm it was 38 per cent. The figure went up to 53 per cent by 3 pm, concluding with 70.75%.

District wise polling data Phase-I   test

Saurashtra

Ahmedabad Rural

South Gujarat

Phase-II

Phase-II of polling was held on 17 December 2012 witnessed a voter turnout of 71.85%.

District wise polling data Phase-II

Ahmedabad

Kutch

Central Gujarat

North Gujarat

With 71.85% of Phase-II voting turnout following the Phase-I turnout of 70.75%, the resultant final voting turnout stood at 72.02%

1980 to 2012 Legislative Assembly Elections statistics in Gujarat

The average turnout percentage in Gujarat had decreased from 64.39% in 1995 to 59.77% during the last four state elections (1995, 1998, 2002, 2007)as per the Election Commission of India statistics.

Results
Counting of votes was held on 20 December 2012. Results were as following.

BJP lost in 16 seats by the margin of less than 2%. The Congress won 46% seats with a margin of less than 5%.

Results by district

List of winning candidates
Following candidates won election from their respective seats:

Bypolls

2013
Four seats became vacant in 2012-13. Bypolls for them was held by Election Commission in June 2013. All four seats were held by Indian National Congress  members. Morva Hadaf MLA Savitaben Khant died in December 2012 while Limbdi MLA Soma Ganda resigned later as he chose to continue as a Member of Parliament. Jayesh Radadiya (Jetpur) and Vitthal Radadiya (Dhoraji) resigned as they left Indian National Congress and joined Bharatiya Janata Party in March 2013. In polls, INC lost all four seats and BJP won all of them.

The by-poll to Surat West was held on 4 December 2013, due to the death of sitting BJP MLA Kishore Wankawala. BJP candidate Purnesh Modi won against INC candidate D I Patel in a result declared on 8 December 2013. It was the first time the NOTA (None of the above) button was introduced in the election in Gujarat. It was used by 2307 voters.

2014
Rapar BJP MLA Vaghjibhai Patel died on 30 January 2014 following heart attack. Lathi MLA Bavku Undhad resigned as he quit INC and joined BJP in January. GPP MLA Keshubhai Patel resigned in February following his ill health. GPP was merged with BJP on 24 February 2014. Nalin Kotadiya who was representing Dhari in assembly, joined BJP along with party. Four more MLAs Rajendrasinh Chavda, Jasabhai Barad, Chhabilbhai Patel and Parbhubhai Vasava quit INC and resigned as they joined BJP in February. Bypolls for all these seven seats were held on 30 April along with 2014 Indian general election. Voting turnout was 74.84% in Somnath, 70.19% in Abdasa, 56.62% in Rapar, 71.87% in Himmatnagar, 56.06% in Visavadar, 64.86% in Lathi  and 67% in Mandvi which stood to an average of 65.92% in all seven constituencies. On 16 May 2014, the result of byepolls was declared along with 2014 Indian general election result. BJP won four while INC won three seats of seven vacant seats. Out of five constituencies which were held by INC before their representatives joined BJP, they retained only one, Abdasa. BJP candidate Bharat Patel, son of former representative Keshubhai Patel, lost to INC candidate Harshad Ribadiya in Visavadar. Shaktisinh Gohil, the former Leader of Opposition, defeated Chhabil Patel in Abdasa.

Following 2014 Indian general election, nine assembly members resigned as they were elected to Loksabha, the lower house of the parliament of India. They all belonged to BJP. Incumbent Chief Minister Narendra Modi resigned as MLA from Maninagar as he won from Vadodara and Varanasi and sworn in as the 14th Prime Minister of India. The eight others include Khambhalia MLA Poonam Madam (elected from Jamnagar), Anand MLA Dilip Patel (Anand), Limkheda MLA Jaswantsinh Bhabhor (Dahod), Deesa MLA Liladhar Vaghela (Patan), Matar MLA Devusinh Chauhan (Kheda), Talaja MLA Bharati Shiyal (Bhavnagar), Mangrol MLA Rajesh Chudasama (Junagadh) and Tankara MLA Mohan Kundariya (Rajkot). Byepolls were held on 13 September 2014 which recorded following voters turnout: Limkheda (64%), Maninagar (33.5%), Deesa (59.76%), Tankara (57%), Khambhalia (55.5%), Mangrol (57%), Talja (49%), Anand (57%) and Matar (54.7%). The results of September byepolls were declared on 16 September 2014. BJP retained six seats while lost three seats to INC. Vajubhai Vala, the incumbent speaker of assembly, resigned as the MLA from Rajkot West and as the speaker on 30 August 2014 following his appointment as the Governor of Karnataka. The byepoll for Rajkot West was held on 15 October 2014 and result was declared on 19 October 2014. BJP retained the seat with Vijay Rupani declared winner candidate.

2016
Rajendrabhai Parabhubhai Patel, the sitting MLA from Choryasi died following dengue in August 2015. His daughter won the bypoll in January 2016. Following death of Jasubhai Barad of INC in January 2016, the bypoll was held for Talala constituency. The bypoll had 63.66 per cent turnout. Govind Parmar of BJP won the bypoll in May 2016 defeating Bhagwanji Barad of INC.

References

External links
 Gujarat Legislative Assembly, Official website 

State Assembly elections in Gujarat
2010s in Gujarat
2012 State Assembly elections in India
December 2012 events in India